Huish is an English surname which derives from the Old English word hīwisc meaning "household". Notable people with the surname include:

Alexander Huish (c.1594–1668), English cleric and academic
David Huish (born 1944), Scottish golfer
Francis Huish (1867–1955), English cricketer
Fred Huish (1869–1957), English cricketer
Justin Huish (born 1975), American archer
Marcus Bourne Huish (1843–1921), English barrister
Mark Huish (1808–1867), English railway manager
Nicholas Huish (fl.1415), English politician
Orson Pratt Huish (1851–1932), Latter Day Saint hymnwriter
Robert Huish (1777–1850), English author

References